Gutiérrez Braun is a district of the Coto Brus canton, in the Puntarenas province of Costa Rica.

Toponymy 
Named after Hernán Gutiérrez Braun, an engineer and architect. Initially at the moment of the creation on 31 July 2014 the district was erroneously named Gutiérrez Brown, but on 7 April 2015, the name was corrected to its proper and current spelling.

History 
Gutiérrez Braun was created on 31 July 2014 by Acuerdo Ejecutivo N° 45-2014-MGP.

Geography 
Gutiérrez Braun has an area of  km² and an elevation of  metres.

Demographics 

For the 2011 census, Gutiérrez Braun had not been created, census data will be available in 2021.

Transportation

Road transportation 
The district is covered by the following road routes:
 National Route 612

References 

Districts of Puntarenas Province
Populated places in Puntarenas Province